Brandon Tory is an American rapper, songwriter, record producer, software engineer and entrepreneur.

Early life 
He was born In the Boston area and raised in Brockton, Massachusetts. He attended the University of Massachusetts Amherst to study electrical engineering. As a kid, Tory dreamed of becoming a hacker and taught himself to code at age 14.

Career 
Tory worked as a senior software architect at Apple in Cupertino, but later transitioned to Google to work on artificial intelligence in Los Angeles.

Before moving to California to work on his debut mixtape SHINE, Tory spent several years living in Atlanta where he wrote songs that would later earn him the recognition and mentorship of producer Timbaland.

Recognition 
He won first place in the Microsoft and Lenovo Team Up With Timbaland national music competition in 2014, beating out over 6000 contestants. In 2018, after revealing his secret life as both a musician and senior Google engineer in a music video titled Seriously, The Wall Street Journal featured Brandon on the cover of their Business section in an article titled "When Your Day Job Isn’t Enough; A Computer Nerd Who Raps". CNBC featured Brandon in their Young Success section with an article titled “From growing up homeless to coding at Apple and Google — all while rapping for Timbaland”. Forbes featured Brandon in an article titled "Google A.I. Engineer/Rapper Wants Kids To Know It's Cool To Be A Genius".

Brandon Tory has received acclaim for opening up publicly about his dichotomy story of balancing music and technology, and overcoming his related self-doubt.

References

External links 
  of Brandon Tory

1989 births
Living people
Google employees
Apple Inc. employees
American male rappers
University of Massachusetts Amherst College of Engineering alumni
Musicians from Brockton, Massachusetts
Rappers from Boston